The East Pacific Center is a skyscraper complex in Shenzhen, China.  The complex consists of four buildings:  

Towers A and B are for residential use and are joined by a sky bridge. They were topped out in late 2012 and were completed during 2013. Towers C and D are office blocks and were completed in 2010. 

As of 2022, Tower A is the tallest residential building in China.

See also

List of tallest buildings in Shenzhen
List of tallest buildings in China
List of tallest residential buildings in the world

References

Skyscrapers in Shenzhen
Skyscraper office buildings in Shenzhen
Residential skyscrapers in China